Patryk Wronka (born August 28, 1995) is a Polish professional ice hockey forward currently playing for Cracovia Krakow in the Polska Hokej Liga. His grandfather, Tadeusz Kacik, also played hockey, and represented Poland at the 1972 Winter Olympics.

Career 
A product of MMKS Podhale Nowy Targ, Wronka made his debut in the Polska Hokej Liga, Poland's first division, during the 2013–14 season, playing in 46 contests (eight goals, 22 assists). In the following two years, he led the club to third-place finishes in the Polska Hokej Liga. After tallying 18 goals and 25 assists in 54 games of the 2015-16 campaign, he opted to continue his career abroad, penning a deal with Orli Znojmo, a club from the Czech Republic, that competes in Austria's elite-league EBEL.

In 2017, he moved back to his native Poland, signing with GKS Katowice.

After spells in the UK with EIHL side Belfast Giants and in France's Ligue Magnus with Rapaces de Gap, Wronka returned to Poland again in 2020 to sign for GKS Tychy.

In 2021, Wronka remained in Poland and re-signed with GKS Katowice. For the 2022-23 season, Wronka moved to fellow Polish club Cracovia Krakow.

National team 
At the 2016 IIHF World Championship Division I Group A, he received Best Forward honors and made the All-Star Team.

References

External links 
 

1995 births
Living people
Belfast Giants players
GKS Katowice (ice hockey) players
GKS Tychy (ice hockey) players
MKS Cracovia (ice hockey) players
Orli Znojmo players
Sportspeople from Zakopane
Polish ice hockey left wingers
Podhale Nowy Targ players
Rapaces de Gap players
Polish expatriate sportspeople in Northern Ireland
Polish expatriate sportspeople in France
Polish expatriate sportspeople in the Czech Republic
Polish expatriate ice hockey people
Expatriate ice hockey players in the Czech Republic
Expatriate ice hockey players in Northern Ireland
Expatriate ice hockey players in France